Of a Simple Man is the second album by Lobo, released in 1972 on Big Tree Records.

It is Lobo's most popular album, peaking at #37 on the US Top LP chart. Two of its singles were Top 10 hits on the Billboard Hot 100 and chart toppers on the Easy Listening chart.

Track listing
All songs are written by Kent LaVoie.

Personnel
Production
Producer: Phil Gernhard
Engineer: Bob Richardson
Photography: Marion Moorman

Charts
Album

Weekly charts

Year-end charts

Singles

References

External links

1972 albums
Big Tree Records albums
Lobo (musician) albums